Yellow is a 2014 Marathi film directed by Mahesh Limaye and produced by Riteish Deshmukh and Uttung Thakur. The story explores a mother/daughter relationship involving developmental disability and childlike behaviour.

The directorial debut film is based on a true story of Gauri Gadgil, a child with special needs, who also plays herself in the film. The film was released on 4 April 2014 to critical acclaim. The film second film of actor Riteish Deshmukh as producer after Balak-Palak (2013).

At the 61st National Film Awards, it won the Special Jury Award, while the child actors Gauri Gadgil and Sanjana Rai received Special Mention.

Summary
Mugdha (Mrinal Kulkarni) and Shekhar (Manoj Joshi) are parents of Gauri (Gauri Gadgil), a child with Down syndrome having mental disability. Despite her unsupportive husband, Mugdha wants to bring Gauri up normally. She separates from her husband and starts living with her brother Shri  (Hrishikesh Joshi). However Gauri remains tough to handle, till she discovers her love for swimming. Thus Mugdha gets her enrolled for coaching for competitive swimming training with coach Pratap Sardeshmukh (Upendra Limaye).

Cast
 Mrinal Kulkarni as Mughdha
 Gauri Gadgil as Gauri
 Upendra Limaye as Pratap Sardeshmukh 
 Hrishikesh Joshi as Shri
 Manoj Joshi as Shekhar
 Usha Nadkarni
 Aishwarya Narkar

Release
The first look promo of the film was released in January 2014.

Awards

See also
 List of Marathi films of 2014

References

External links
 

2014 films
Down syndrome in film
Indian films based on actual events
2014 directorial debut films
Films about disability in India
Special Jury Award (feature film) National Film Award winners
2010s Marathi-language films